Fatemiyeh (also Romanized as Fāţemīyeh) is a village in Asemanabad Rural District, in the Central District of Chardavol County, Ilam Province, Iran. At the 2006 census, its population was 505, in 103 families. The village is populated by Kurds.

References 

Populated places in Chardavol County
Kurdish settlements in Ilam Province